Necklacing is a method of extrajudicial summary execution and torture carried out by forcing a rubber tire drenched with petrol around a victim's chest and arms, and setting it on fire.  The term "necklace" originated in the 1980s in black townships of apartheid South Africa where suspected Apartheid collaborators were publicly executed in this fashion.

South Africa
Necklacing was used by the black community to punish its members who were perceived as collaborators with the apartheid government. Necklacing was primarily used on black police informants; the practice was often carried out in the name of the struggle, although the executive body of the African National Congress (ANC), the most broadly supported South African opposition movement, condemned it. In 1986, Winnie Mandela, then-wife of the imprisoned Nelson Mandela, and who herself had endured torture and four imprisonments to a total of two years, stated, "With our boxes of matches, and our necklaces, we shall liberate this country", which was widely seen as an explicit endorsement of necklacing. This caused the ANC to initially distance itself from her, although she later took on a number of official positions within the party.

The first victim of necklacing, according to the South African Truth and Reconciliation Commission, was a young black woman, Maki Skosana, on 20 July 1985.

Photojournalist Kevin Carter was the first to photograph a public execution by necklacing in South Africa in the mid-1980s. He later spoke of the images: 

Author Lynda Schuster writes, 

Some commentators have noted that the practice of necklacing served to escalate the levels of violence during the township wars of the 1980s and early 1990s as security force members became brutalized and afraid that they might fall victim to the practice.

In other countries
This form of lynching was used in Haiti, where it was known as Pé Lebrun, or Père Lebrun (French), after a tire advertisement showing a man with a tire around his neck. It was used prominently by mobs allied with Jean-Bertrand Aristide to assassinate political enemies. Aristide himself allegedly showed strong support for this practice, calling it a "beautiful tool" that "smells good", encouraging his Lavalas supporters to use it against wealthy people as well as members of the Lavalas party who were not as strong in their fervor.

In the early years of the 1960s, when the seeds of the ethnic conflict in Sri Lanka (Sri Lankan Civil War) related to Eelam were being sown, Sinhalese rioters used necklacing in anti-Tamil riots. Necklacing was also widely used in the second armed insurrection led by the Janatha Vimukthi Peramuna. A graphic description of one such necklacing appears in the book The Island of Blood by journalist Anita Pratap.
This technique was widely applied on innocent Sikhs by the mobs during state sponsored massacre of the community, following the assassination of then-Indian Prime Minister Indira Gandhi by her Sikh bodyguards in the first week of November, 1984.
In the early 1990s, university students in Abidjan, Ivory Coast, were plagued by burglars stealing from their dormitories. The students took matters into their own hands by capturing the alleged thieves, and then executed them by placing tyres around their necks and setting the tyres on fire. Ivorian police, powerless to stop these necklacings, could do nothing but stand by and watch.

In 2006, at least one person died in Nigeria by necklacing in the deadly Muslim protests over satirical cartoon drawings of Muhammad.

The practice is widely used by drug dealers in Brazil, notably in Rio de Janeiro, where it is called micro-ondas, or microwave in Portuguese. Journalist Tim Lopes was a notable victim.

References

External links 
 An exploratory study of insider accounts of necklacing in three Port Elizabeth townships by Ntuthu Nomoyi and Willem Schurink, "Violence in South Africa: A Variety of Perspectives", editors Elirea Bornman, René van Eeden, Marie Wentzel, HSRC, Chapter 6, pp. 147–173, .

Criminal homicide
Execution methods
Extrajudicial killings in South Africa
Tires
Torture